A case sealer or box sealer is a piece of equipment used for closing or sealing corrugated boxes.  It is most commonly used for regular slotted containers (RSC) and can involve adhesive (cold water-borne or hot melt adhesive), box sealing tape, or  Gummed (water activated) tape.

By contrast, a case erector is equipment for setting-up flat (knocked-down) corrugated boxes and applying a closure to the bottom flaps.

Semi-automated 

With semi automatic equipment, the operator typically fills and loads a box at the entrance to the case sealer;  the box may or may not have the bottom flaps previously closed.   The operator closes the top flaps and feeds the box  in or through a machine which automatically applies the closure.  This helps save time and controls the application of the closure materials such as box sealing tape

Fully automated

Fully automatic equipment is available which does not require an operator. All functions, including closing the flaps, can be automated.

Other
Case sealers can also be categorized as either adjustable to fit production runs of a uniform box size or random, capable of handling a mixed variety of box sizes without machine adjustment.  

Several machine design options have been developed.

See also

 Box-sealing tape
 Automation

Notes

References
 Yam, K.L., "Encyclopedia of Packaging Technology", John Wiley & Sons, 2009,

External links

Packaging machinery
Industrial equipment